U.S. Route 78 (US 78) is a  U.S. highway that travels from Memphis, Tennessee to Charleston, South Carolina. In the U.S. state of South Carolina, it travels from the Savannah River at North Augusta to its eastern terminus in Charleston; connecting the cities of Aiken, Summerville, and North Charleston.

Route description
US 78 enters South Carolina by crossing the Savannah River in North Augusta; sharing concurrences with US 1, US 25, US 278 and South Carolina Highway 121 (SC 121). In the immediate  area, it sheds most concurrencies, sharing only with US 1 towards Aiken; it also connects with Interstate 520 (I-520), which is a partial beltway around the Augusta metropolitan area. In Aiken, it travels through the downtown area, where US 1 splits north towards Columbia. West of Williston is SC 781, which connects back with US 278; the routing allows travelers to bypass Aiken all together between Williston and Augusta.

Traveling in a southeasterly direction, it goes through the cities and towns of Williston, Blackville, Denmark, Bamberg, Branchville and St. George, where connects with I-95. Continuing east, it passes through Dorchester and begins to parallel with I-26 in a southeasterly direction through Summerville. It enters Charleston County at Lincolnville, where the highway skirts just inches south of the Berkeley County line. In North Charleston, US 78 shares a concurrency with US 52, as it connects with I-526. Entering Charleston, it splits with US 52 and goes south along King Street; its eastern terminus at Line Street, a block away from US 52's eastern/southern terminus and nearby to I-26/US 17 interchange.

US 78 is a predominantly two-lane rural highway connecting much of the Lowcountry. Wider sections (four-lanes or more) are found between North Augusta–Aiken, St. George, and North Charleston. Though it provides the most direct route between Augusta (and points west, such as Atlanta) and Charleston (using US 278 and SC 781 to bypass Aiken), it is not a busy route because of the many cities and towns it goes through.

History
Established in 1927 as an original US highway, it traveled closely as it does today; from North Augusta to Charleston, connecting the cities and towns of Aiken, Bamberg, St. George, and North Charleston.

By 1931, US 78 was rerouted north of Summerville and Lincolnville, leaving Richardson Avenue/Lincoln Avenue. Around 1939, US 78 was realigned from Meeting Street to Rivers Street, south of Durant Avenue in the Charleston area. Also in 1939, US 78 was fully paved in the state, its last unpaved section was between St. George and US 178. By 1952, US 78 was placed on new four-lane highway bypassing Clearwater, Burnettown, and Gloverville; also by same year a new bridge was constructed over the Savannah River, leaving Fifth Street Bridge. By 1967, US 78 was adjusted to bypass south of mainstreet Blackville, leaving a secondary road, but was later upgraded as a connector (signed as a business loop).

Major intersections

See also
 
 
 Special routes of U.S. Route 78

References

External links

 
 End of US highway 78 on USends.com
 US 78 at Virginia Highways' South Carolina Highways Annex

 South Carolina
78
Transportation in Aiken County, South Carolina
Transportation in Barnwell County, South Carolina
Transportation in Bamberg County, South Carolina
Transportation in Orangeburg County, South Carolina
Transportation in Dorchester County, South Carolina
Transportation in Charleston County, South Carolina
North Augusta, South Carolina
Aiken, South Carolina
Summerville, South Carolina
Transportation in North Charleston, South Carolina
Transportation in Charleston, South Carolina